The Jefferson County Courthouse in Courthouse Square in Louisville, Georgia was built in 1904.  It was listed on the National Register of Historic Places in 1980.   It is also a contributing property to the Louisville Commercial Historic District.

It was designed by architect W.F. Denny who died in 1905, and was built by contractor F.P. Hiefner.  It is Classical Revival in style.  It has an Ionic tetrastyle entrance and Ionic pilasters.

It stands on the site of Georgia's "Old State House", the state's first capitol building;  old brick and timbers of the historic building's foundation were found during construction.

See also
Louisville Commercial Historic District

References

External links
 

Courthouses on the National Register of Historic Places in Georgia (U.S. state)
Neoclassical architecture in Georgia (U.S. state)
1904 establishments in Georgia (U.S. state)
Government buildings completed in 1904
National Register of Historic Places in Jefferson County, Georgia